Brian Smrz (born ), also Brian Delaney Smrz, is a Hollywood stunt coordinator and second unit director of projects such as Live Free or Die Hard, Mission: Impossible 2, Eagle Eye, Night at the Museum, Windtalkers and Superman Returns, among others. He is also the director of Hero Wanted, starring Cuba Gooding, Jr. and Ray Liotta and of 24 Hours to Live, starring Ethan Hawke and Xu Qing.  He won the Taurus Award twice and was nominated a third time.

Career
Smrz has worked as a stunt performer and stunt coordinator on Hollywood films since 1981. In more recent years, he has acted as second unit director and director on projects such as Hero Wanted, Fantastic Four and Face/Off. He has worked on several of director John Woo's American films, including Windtalkers, Paycheck and Mission: Impossible 2.

Smrz shared a Taurus Award for stuntwork on Mission: Impossible 2 and Live Free or Die Hard.  He was also nominated for Taxi.  In an otherwise negative review of Taxi, Variety praised Smrz's stunts.

Hero Wanted is his directorial debut. It is a crime drama/action film starring Cuba Gooding, Jr., Ray Liotta and Norman Reedus.  Shooting occurred in Sofia, Bulgaria with a crew composed mostly of Bulgarians.

Personal life
Smrz is from Strafford, Pennsylvania and was the twin brother of the stuntman Brett Smrz, who died while performing a stunt jump off a building. Smrz was hospitalized after a stunt went wrong in 1992 on Cyborg 2. The incident was investigated by the Screen Actors Guild.

References

External links

Living people
American stunt performers
People from Chester County, Pennsylvania
Film directors from Pennsylvania
Year of birth missing (living people)